The electoral district of Mornington is an electoral district of the Victorian Legislative Assembly. The electorate can be described as outer metropolitan and rural, including animal farming, grape production and wineries. The district is 155 square kilometres in area.

It was first created in 1859 when the Electoral district of Evelyn and Mornington was abolished and split in two. The district of Mornington initially included the entire Mornington Peninsula, Phillip Island and French Island.  Currently it includes Mornington, Mount Eliza, Mount Martha and Tuerong, and parts of Baxter and Moorooduc.

Mornington has been held by the Liberal Party since it was re-created in 1985. Since 2022, the member for Mornington is Chris Crewther, who previously held the overlapping federal seat of Dunkley from 2016 to 2019.

Members for Mornington

Election results

Historical maps

External links
 District profile from the Victorian Electoral Commission

References

Electoral districts of Victoria (Australia)
1859 establishments in Australia
1967 disestablishments in Australia
1985 establishments in Australia
Electoral district
Electoral districts and divisions of Greater Melbourne